Neo is a Hungarian indie-electronic band, best known for producing the music for the movie Kontroll.

History 
The band was formed in autumn of 1998 from the idea of Mátyás Milkovics. During the first five years of existence, Márk Moldvai worked with Mátyás Milkovics as a duo. Their first single was released in 1998, an adaptation of "The Pink Panther Theme".

2004 marked the birth of an entirely new Neo, in which, with Mátyás Milkovics, were Enikő Hodosi, Péter Kőváry and Gergő Szőcs, an electro-drummer who joined the creative group in the second part of the year.

On 27 June 2022, former band mate, Péter Kőváry died at the age of 50.

Discography

Albums and EPs 
 Eklektogram (1999) #11
 Lo-Tech Man, Hi-Tech World (2002)
 Kontroll EP (2003)
 Maps for a Voyage (2006) #8
 Six Pixels EP (2010)
 The Picture (2011)

Singles 
 The Pink Panther Theme (1998)
 Persuaders (1999)
 Aiiaiiiyo (2000)
 Diskhead (2002)
 Everybody Come On (2002) #3
 Kontroll/It's Over Now (2004)#13
 It's Over Now (2005, Never released)
 Record Straight (2006) #1
 Absolution (2007) #24
 Spellbound (2008) #39
 Serial Killer (2010)
 Hiii Train (2011)

Videography

DVD 
 "A Planetary Voyage" (2007)

External links 
 NeoBand – Official Band Website

Sources

Hungarian pop music groups
Hungarian electronic musicians
Hungarian new wave musical groups